Thomas Ban(n)ister or Banester may refer to:

Thomas Banister (Captain) of Kendenup, Western Australia
Thomas Banester (died 1571), MP for Reigate
Thomas Bannister (1799–1874), Australian soldier and explorer